The 2005 K League was the 23rd season of the K League. It kicked off on May 15, and was finished on 4 December. The format of the regular season and championship playoffs was the same as the one used in the 2004 season.

Busan IPark won the first stage, and the second stage was won by Seongnam Ilhwa Chunma. Two winners were guaranteed their slot in the end-of-season playoffs. Incheon United and Ulsan Hyundai Horang-i also joined the playoffs according to the overall table after two stages. In the semi-finals Ulsan defeated Seongnam 2–1, and Incheon defeated Busan 2–0. The two victorious teams faced each other in the two-legged championship final. Ulsan won the first leg 5–1 at the Incheon stadium, and though Incheon won the second leg 2–1, Ulsan lifted their second league title 6–3 on aggregate.

Regular season

First stage
The first place team qualified for the championship playoffs.

Second stage
The first place team qualified for the championship playoffs.

Overall table
The top two teams in the overall table qualified for the championship playoffs.

Championship playoffs

Bracket

Final table

Top scorers
This list includes goals of the championship playoffs.

Awards

Main awards

Best XI

Source:

See also
 2005 in South Korean football
 2005 K League Championship
 2005 Korean League Cup
 2005 Korean FA Cup

References

External links
 RSSSF

K League seasons
1
South Korea
South Korea